Kao Liao is a district (amphoe) of Nakhon Sawan province, central Thailand.

History
The minor district (king amphoe) was created on 1 October 1969, when five tambons were split off from Banphot Phisai district. It was upgraded to a full district on 28 June 1973.

Geography
Neighboring districts are (from the north clockwise): Banphot Phisai of Nakhon Sawan Province; Pho Thale of Phichit province; Chum Saeng and Mueang Nakhon Sawan of Nakhon Sawan.

Administration
The district is divided into five sub-districts (tambons), which are further subdivided into 44 villages (mubans). Kao Liao is a township (thesaban tambon) which covers the whole tambon Kao Liao. There are a further four tambon administrative organizations (TAO).

References

External links
amphoe.com

Kao Liao